Hella Jongerius (born 30 May 1963 in De Meern, Utrecht) is a Dutch industrial designer.

Biography 
Jongerius was born in De Meern, a village to the west of Utrecht in the Netherlands in 1963. From 1988 to 1993, she studied design at the Design Academy Eindhoven. After graduating, she worked for a few projects at Droog Design. She founded her own studio called Jongeriuslab in Rotterdam in 1993. She taught at the Design Academy Eindhoven as head of the department Living/Atelier (1988–1993). Her clients include Maharam (New York), KLM (Netherlands), Vitra (Switzerland), IKEA (Sweden), Camper (Spain), Nymphenburg (Germany) and, Royal Tichelaar Makkum (Netherlands). Her designs have been exhibited at galleries and museums such as the Cooper Hewitt National Design Museum (New York), MoMA (New York), Stedelijk Museum (Netherlands), Museum Boijmans Van Beuningen (Rotterdam), the Design Museum (London), Galerie kreo (Paris) and Moss Gallery (New York). In 2008 Jongerius moved her studio to Berlin.

Works 
Through Jongeriuslab, she produces various collections of textiles, crockery and furniture. Her design focuses on combining opposites; for example, new technology and handmade objects, industrial manufacturing and craftsmanship, and the traditional and the contemporary. Her works are often highly textural; for example, rough edged leather is rolled up to create wheels, paint is splashed on earthenware, ceramics are sewn onto cotton tablecloths, sinks are made of rubber. Jongerius prefers working with textiles so that she can practice her creativity without making a new product from scratch. According to New York Times design critic Alice Rawsthorn, Jongerius' "greatest achievement is bringing sensuality and sophistication to the sanitary industrial design".

In 2012, Jongerius designed a new interior and seats for the business class cabin in KLM's Boeing 747. She is currently continuing on the business and economy class cabins for KLM's 777 and Dreamliner planes. In 2013, together with architect Rem Koolhaas, she redesigned the North Delegates' Lounge at the United Nations Headquarters in New York City. For Nymphenburg Porcelain Manufactory, Jongerius designed the Nymphenburg Sketches, Four Seasons and Animal Bowls.

Sustainability 

Jongerius's perspective on sustainability in design is that it should be built to last. She is a proponent of longtermism and is an outspoken critic of  ephemeral, low-quality objects — which in her view, should not exist. She has stated, "There's too much shit design" and:"It's not the design that is the real issue but the amount that is being produced, that is where the evil starts; it just doesn't really add anything to the world."Jongerius sees longtermism as a solution for the wastefulness of design. She wishes modern designers would follow in the paths of 20th century industrial design greats such as Le Corbusier and Gerrit Rietveld. Jongerius believes that designers are either "merchants" or "pastors". These "merchants" are guilty, in her mind, of producing too much that doesn't last. "Merchants are the ones who keep the machine spinning for profit without any conscience and pastors are the ones who want to change something in the world and feel responsible."Theorist Louise Schouwenberg and Jongerius published an opinion piece called Beyond the New: a search for ideals in design about the current state of design and sustainability."We are in search for new ideals in design, a holistic approach on all levels."

Gallery 
Product designs

UN Delegates' Lounge New York

Publications 
 2003, Hella Jongerius; text by Louise Schouwenberg, Phaidon Press
 2011, Hella Jongerius – Misfit; text by Louise Schouwenberg, Alice Rawsthorn, Paola Antonelli, graphic design by Irma Boom, Phaidon Publisher
 2015, Beyond the New: a search for ideals in design, opinion by Hella Jongerius and theorist Louise Schouwenberg
 2016, I Don't Have a Favourite Colour: Creating the Vitra Colour and Material Library,  Berlin,

Exhibitions 
 1994, participant at the first Droog Design exhibition at the Milan Furniture Fair with Bath Mat at Milan, Italy
 1995, Mutant Materials in Contemporary Design, The Museum of Modern Art at New York, USA
 1996, Thresholds in Contemporary Design from the Netherlands, Museum of Contemporary Art at New York, USA
 1996, Self-Manufacturing Designers exhibition at the Stedelijk Museum at Amsterdam, Netherlands
 2001, Develops the My Soft Office series of futuristic office furniture for the Workspheres exhibition at the Museum of Modern Art at New York City, United States
 2002, Skin: Surface and Structure in Contemporary Design, Cooper Hewitt National Design Museum at New York City, United States
 2003, solo exhibition at the Design Museum at London, UK
 2005, guest curator for Cooper Hewitt National Design Museum at New York City, United States
 2005, On The Shelves solo exhibition Hella Jongerius at Villa Noailles at Hyères, France
 2005, Ideal House at the Internationale Mobelmesse Koln at Cologne, Germany
 2007, Inside Colours installation for MyHome exhibition at Vitra Design Museum at Basel, Switzerland
 2010, Hella Jongerius' Special Collectors Artwork: 300 Unique Vases at Royal Tichelaar Makkum, Netherlands
 2010, Taking a Stance, a representative overview for Dutch DFA at the Dutch Cultural Centre at Shanghai, China 
 2010, Hella Jongerius – Misfit at Museum Boijmans Van Beuningen, Rotterdam, Netherlands
 2012, Oranienbaum Summer Exhibition at Oranienbaum Place near Berlin, Germany
 2013, Salone del Mobile at Milan, Italy
 2013, Design Miami at Basel, Switzerland
 2013, opening of the United Nations North Delegates' Lounge 
 2017, Design Museum, London
 2021, Hella Jongerius: Woven Cosmos, Gropius Bau, Berlin

References

External links 
 JongeriusLab, official site
 Hella Jongerius at the Design Museum (London), including a Q&A with the designer and biography dates
 Hella Jongerius at the Cooper Hewitt National Design Museum (US)
 Hella Jongerius on artsy.net
 Hella Jongerius at Nationalmuseum, Sweden

1963 births
Living people
Dutch designers
Dutch ceramists
Dutch women ceramists
Design Academy Eindhoven alumni
Academic staff of Design Academy Eindhoven
People from Vleuten-De Meern
Industrial design